Tammy Cole (born 13 April 1973 in Queensland) is a retired female field hockey defender from Australia.

She was a member of the Hockeyroos at the 2002 Commonwealth Games in Manchester, where the team ended up in third place in the overall-rankings.

References
 Profile Australia Hockey

1973 births
Living people
Australian female field hockey players
Field hockey players at the 2002 Commonwealth Games
Commonwealth Games bronze medallists for Australia
People from Queensland
Commonwealth Games medallists in field hockey
Medallists at the 2002 Commonwealth Games